Wendar Island comprises a main unpopulated island and five immediately adjacent islets located close to the south-western coast of Tasmania, Australia. The Mutton Bird Island is part of the Southwest National Park and the Tasmanian Wilderness World Heritage Site.

Fauna
The island is part of the Port Davey Islands Important Bird Area, so identified by BirdLife International because of its importance for breeding seabirds. Recorded breeding seabird species are the little penguin (500 pairs), short-tailed shearwater (3-4000 pairs), fairy prion (1500 pairs) and silver gull.

See also

 List of islands of Tasmania

References

Islands of South West Tasmania
Protected areas of Tasmania
Important Bird Areas of Tasmania